Tracy Lemon (1 January 1970–20 June 2012) was a former rugby union player. She made her Black Ferns debut in 1990 against a Russia XV's team. She competed at the 1991 Women's Rugby World Cup in Wales.

Career 
In 2000, Lemon suffered a horrific hamstring injury where she ripped it from the bone; she was playing in a Super 12 curtain-raiser match.
Lemon has also represented New Zealand in triathlon and outrigger canoe. She is accredited with introducing Valerie Adams to shot put as her P.E teacher at Southern Cross Campus.

Death 
Lemon died in June 2012 at the age of 42.

References

External links 

 Black Ferns Profile

1970 births
2012 deaths
New Zealand women's international rugby union players
New Zealand female rugby union players